One Horse Store is an unincorporated community in Arkansas County, Arkansas, United States. The community is located where Arkansas Highway 276 intersects Arkansas Highway 11.

Education
Residents are in the DeWitt School District. It operates DeWitt High School.

References

Unincorporated communities in Arkansas County, Arkansas
Unincorporated communities in Arkansas